Loretto is a small rural city in Hennepin County, Minnesota, United States.  The population was 650 at the 2010 census.

Geography
County Roads 11 and 19 are two of the main routes. Nearby places include Medina, Maple Plain, Independence, Greenfield, and Corcoran.

History
Loretto was founded in 1886, and settled by German and Dutch immigrants.  Loretto was named for a Roman Catholic mission for refugees of the Huron Indians near Quebec, Canada, named Lorette.  The original source of the name is Loreto, a small town in Italy, which has a noted shrine of pilgrimage.

The city was incorporated in 1940.  The first mayor was Albert Van Beusekom.

In 2010, Loretto elected Kent Koch as its mayor.  Koch was the starting second baseman on the St. Cloud State University baseball team, and was believed to be the only college student in the country who was also a mayor.

Demographics

2010 census
As of the census of 2010, there were 650 people, 269 households, and 168 families living in the city. The racial makeup of the city was 98.6% White, 0.3% African American, 0.3% from other races, and 0.8% from two or more races. Hispanic or Latino of any race were 1.2% of the population.

There were 269 households, of which 34.6% had children under the age of 18 living with them, 53.2% were married couples living together, 7.8% had a female householder with no husband present, 1.5% had a male householder with no wife present, and 37.5% were non-families. 30.9% of all households were made up of individuals, and 11.6% had someone living alone who was 65 years of age or older. The average household size was 2.42 and the average family size was 3.10.

The median age in the city was 39.9 years. 24.6% of residents were under the age of 18; 7.4% were between the ages of 18 and 24; 25.5% were from 25 to 44; 30.2% were from 45 to 64; and 12.2% were 65 years of age or older. The gender makeup of the city was 50.3% male and 49.7% female.

2000 census
As of the census of 2000, there were 570 people, 225 households, and 146 families living in the city. The racial makeup of the city was 98.95% White, 0.53% Native American, and 0.53% from two or more races. Hispanic or Latino of any race were 0.18% of the population. 56.7% were of German, 7.6% Irish and 6.2% Norwegian ancestry according to Census 2000.

There were 225 households, out of which 38.7% had children under the age of 18 living with them, 60.4% were married couples living together, 4.9% had a female householder with no husband present, and 34.7% were non-families. 27.6% of all households were made up of individuals, and 9.3% had someone living alone who was 65 years of age or older.  The average household size was 2.53 and the average family size was 3.22.

In the city, the population was spread out, with 29.3% under the age of 18, 7.5% from 18 to 24, 33.7% from 25 to 44, 18.8% from 45 to 64, and 10.7% who were 65 years of age or older.  The median age was 35 years. For every 100 females, there were 107.3 males.  For every 100 females age 18 and over, there were 102.5 males.

The median income for a household in the city was $54,375, and the median income for a family was $71,944. Males had a median income of $50,208 versus $32,321 for females. The per capita income for the city was $27,443.  About 0.7% of families and 1.6% of the population were below the poverty line, including none of those under age 18 and 8.2% of those age 65 or over.

References

External links
 City website

Cities in Minnesota
Cities in Hennepin County, Minnesota
Populated places established in 1886